Art Attack is a British children's television programme revolving around art, originally hosted by Neil Buchanan on CITV from 1990 to 2007, and subsequently hosted by Lloyd Warbey on Disney Junior from 2012 to 2015.

The original programme aired on CITV between 15 June 1990 and 19 May 2007, and was presented by one of its creators, Neil Buchanan, throughout. Buchanan also wrote and produced the programme, and came up with a majority of the creative ideas.

A new series launched on Disney Junior (UK & Ireland) on 6 June 2011 and was presented by Jassa Ahluwalia. Each show involved Ahluwalia voicing-over footage of an artist producing three works of art, taking the viewer through the various stages of production step by step. Ahluwalia was later replaced with Lloyd Warbey at the start of the British second revived series.

History
The programme was originally a TVS production, devised by two TVS employees, Neil Buchanan and Tim Edmunds. Buchanan and Edmunds met each other at Southern Television in 1978, and worked together on No. 73 and Do It!.

The first Art Attacks were a strand within No. 73, and this segment proved so popular, Nigel Pickard, the executive producer of children's programming at TVS, green-lit the pilot. The Art Attack pilot was shot on location at a disused swimming pool in Gillingham, Kent in 1989, and the series began the following year.

When TVS lost its franchise, Edmunds and Buchanan bought the rights to the show and produced Art Attack through their company, The Media Merchants. The Media Merchants used STV Studios (then known as "SMG Productions"), as the ITV company to get the series onto the network: this was partly down to the fact that Nigel Pickard had moved to Scottish Television. In 1993 another ex-TVS employee, Peter Urie set up a production management company, Television Support Services. Television Support Services managed and co wrote all the Media Merchants productions.

For most of its run, the show was filmed at The Maidstone Studios, Maidstone, Kent. In 1998, Disney bought the rights to produce foreign-language versions of Art Attack. Each version had a different local host for each territory, and was made in Maidstone, on a similar set to the original version. Neil Buchanan's Big Art Attacks were retained in the international shows, as was The Head, who was dubbed by relevant local voice artists. Buchanan also produced the artwork for the foreign versions - footage of his hands creating the pieces would be voiced over by the local host, who would show the artwork in-between stages and explain what to do next. Disney ended production of the foreign shows in 2005.

ITV announced the cancellation of the series in July 2007. Until May 30 2011, the show was regularly repeated on CITV, usually on weekend afternoons. After the programme's demise, many of the production team transferred to Finger Tips and Mister Maker, both recorded at The Maidstone Studios.

In 2010, Disney announced an updated version of the series would air on Disney Junior around the world. Production was moved to Disney's studios in Buenos Aires, Argentina. Once again, several versions were made for each market; these were produced in an equivalent manner to the previous international versions. The first series of the new UK version was presented by Jassa Ahluwalia. Local artist Alexiev Gandman was brought in to create the Big Art Attacks.

In December 2012, Buchanan was featured in a segment dedicated to the programme's original run in the one-off documentary special 30 Years of CITV: a 1992 episode was broadcast on the CITV channel shortly after the above was broadcast, as part of its "Old Skool Weekend" marathon.

Characters
"The Head" was a puppet stone bust, based on Constantine the Great, who would humorously recap the steps needed to produce the last art piece made. After doing this, he would usually show his own creation of the previous Art Attack, most times however getting it comically wrong to his own sorrow or annoyance. However, on occasion, by accidentally doing part of the instructions incorrectly, he would create a different effect to that desired and be proud of his work. At other times he would tell jokes or make puns, particularly after the Big Art Attacks. In Series one, 'The Head' was played by Jim Sweeney, in series 2, Andrew O'Connor; and from series 3, having been redesigned as a puppet, he was voiced and operated by Francis Wright. 'The Head' did not appear in series 12 or 13, or in series 18 and 19.

In the revived series, The Head was replaced by a talking palm tree called "Vincent Van Coconut", voiced by Tim Hibber. The name is a parody of Dutch painter Vincent van Gogh.

Series guide

Original series (1990-2007)

Christmas specials

Other

Revived series (2011-2015)

(Source: ITV/Hit Entertainment/BFI/Disney)

Video releases

No DVD releases have been issued in the UK, except DVDs bundled with Art Attack books and DVDs which came free with newspapers. In India, Art Attack was released in three volumes by Disney DVD in 2010.

Many Art Attack books were also released by Dorling Kindersley.

International broadcast 
Disney Channel and its various offshoots have broadcast Art Attack in most territories since the late 1990s, producing localised versions of the programme for many countries. In Australia, it was broadcast on ABC from July 1995 to October 1999; later episodes were broadcast on Disney Channel, with the revived series being broadcast on Disney Junior and on various channels of the Seven Network. In Canada, the programme has aired variously on TVOKids, Family Jr. and Knowledge Kids; in the United States, it was broadcast on WAM! during the 1990s. Art Attack has also aired in several other countries such as SABC2 in South Africa, StarHub and Disney Channel in Singapore, TVB in Hong Kong, KTN in Kenya, Channel 33 in the United Arab Emirates, Fun Channel and Disney Channel in the Middle East and RTB in Brunei.

The original series, hosted by Neil Buchanan, has also been dubbed or subtitled in various non-English speaking countries, having been broadcast in various forms by Dragon Club in China, ET1 in Greece, Disney Channel in Taiwan and TRT in Turkey; in the Middle East, the Turkish version of the revived series has been subtitled into Arabic and broadcast by Jeem TV. In much of Latin America, the programme was broadcast on Discovery Kids during the 1990s, dubbed into Spanish and Portuguese. From 2000 to 2002, localised versions in Spanish and Portuguese were produced by Disney, which aired on Disney Channel Latin America and Disney Channel (Brazil), as well as Disney Channel (Portugal), respectively, and hosted by Rui Torres; in later years, the British version was dubbed and broadcast by Disney in these territories. A Hindi version has been produced for India from 2011 to 2014, hosted by Gaurav Juyal; previously, the UK version was aired, dubbed in Hindi. A Scandinavian version of the program, hosted by Leon Jilber and produced in Swedish (with Danish and Norwegian dubs also available) initially aired on the Scandinavian version of Disney Junior, but has since moved to Disney Channel Scandinavia. An Italian version has been produced for Italy from 1998 to 2005 and from 2011 to 2014, hosted by Giovanni Muciaccia.

The series was also broadcast on armed forces television on BFBS (which broadcasts thousands of television series and films from the UK as well as a number of television series and films other countries) and its defunct channel SSVC Television (which went from 1982 to 1997) as part of their children's blocks Room 785 and Children's SSVC. The channels have aired the show in a number of countries including Germany, Cyprus, Bosnia and Herzegovina, Gibraltar, Belize and Falkland Islands.

See also
SMart – another children's art television show, aired from 1994 to 2009.
Art Ninja – another children's art television show aired since 2015.
School of Chocolate- a programme which makes chocolate art since 2021.

Notes

References

External links
Art Attack at Disney.co.uk
Art Attack with Neil Buchanan at HIT Entertainment

1990 British television series debuts
2015 British television series endings
1990s British children's television series
2000s British children's television series
2010s British children's television series
Australian Broadcasting Corporation original programming
British preschool education television series
British television series revived after cancellation
British television shows featuring puppetry
BAFTA winners (television series)
Disney Channel original programming
Disney Channels Worldwide original programming
English-language television shows
ITV children's television shows
Television series about art
Television series by ITV Studios
Television series by Mattel Creations
Television series by STV Studios
Television shows produced by Scottish Television
Television shows produced by Television South (TVS)
Gullane Entertainment
1990s preschool education television series
2000s preschool education television series
2010s preschool education television series